Blecher may refer to:

 Max Blecher (1909–1938), Romanian writer
 Taddy Blecher, South African actuary, management consultant and educational entrepreneur
 Sara Blecher, South African film director

German-language surnames
Occupational surnames